The , formally the , is a  subway line operated by Tokyo Metro in west-central Tokyo and Wako, Saitama, Japan. The newest line in the Tokyo subway network, it opened in stages between 1994 and 2008. On average, the Fukutoshin Line carried 362,654 passengers daily in 2017, the lowest of all Tokyo Metro lines and roughly one third of its sister Tokyo Metro Yūrakuchō Line (1,124,478).

Overview

It is the second Tokyo Metro line to feature express services, after the Tōzai Line; however, unlike the Tōzai Line (where rapid services are only offered on the  –  section), the Fukutoshin Line offers express services throughout the line, a first for Tokyo Metro. Express trains pass local trains at Higashi-Shinjuku, where additional tracks are installed for this purpose. Local trains stop at all stations.

When first opened, the line operated through services to Kawagoeshi Station on the Tobu Tojo Line and Hannō Station on the Seibu Ikebukuro Line. From 16 March 2013, the Tōkyū Tōyoko Line moved to share the line's Shibuya terminus, and since then through services have operated onto the Minatomirai Line via the Tōyoko Line, terminating at Motomachi-Chūkagai Station in Yokohama. This is a rare instance of a Tokyo Metro train operating on four companies' tracks.

Since the opening of the section between Ikebukuro and Shibuya station, the Fukutoshin Line operates as a one-man operation subway line between Kotake-Mukaihara Station and Shibuya Station where chest-high platform edge doors are installed on the station platforms to aid the drivers. From 28 March 2015, the one-man operation had extended from Kotake-Mukaihara to Wakōshi station, making this as the third Tokyo Metro line to fully operate as one-man operation other than Namboku Line and Maruonuchi Line.

Like most Tokyo Metro lines, the first carriage of the Fukutoshin Line is designated a "women-only car" before and during the morning rush hour. During these hours only women, children of elementary school age or younger and physically disabled passengers (and their carers) may board the first carriage.

Station list
 Express and commuter express trains stop at stations marked "●" and pass those marked "｜". 
 Local trains stop at all stations.

Rolling stock

Tokyo Metro
7000 series trains (until April 2022)
10000 series 10-car (and occasionally 8-car) trains
17000 series 8-car and 10-car trains (since 21 February 2021)

Other operators
 Seibu 6000 series 10-car trains
 Seibu 6050 series 10-car trains
 Seibu 40000 series 10-car trains (since 25 March 2017)
 Seibu 40050 series 10-car trains 
 Tobu 9000 series 10-car trains
 Tobu 9050 series 10-car trains
 Tobu 50070 series 10-car trains
 Tokyu 5000 series 8-car trains
 Tokyu 5050 series 8-car trains
 Tokyu 5050-4000 series 10-car trains (since 10 September 2012)
 Yokohama Minatomirai Railway Y500 series 8-car trains (a Tokyu 5000 series variant)
 Sotetsu 20000 series 10-car trains

History

Fukutoshin is Japanese for "secondary city center", and the Fukutoshin Line connects three of Tokyo's secondary city centers: Ikebukuro, Shinjuku and Shibuya. Prior to its opening, only JR East had rail service between the three (on the Yamanote Line, the Saikyō Line and the Shōnan-Shinjuku Line). The new line was conceived to relieve congestion along this busy corridor, and to provide convenient through service between the northwest, the southwest and the central part of Tokyo served by the Yamanote Line.

The line was initially planned in 1972 as a run from Shiki to Shinjuku, with the possibility of further extension to Shibuya,  and Haneda Airport. In 1985, a second Ministry of Transportation committee proposed that the line terminate at Shibuya. Part of the northern end of the original plan line became unnecessary following improvements to the Tobu Tojo Line and the beginning of through service from the Yurakucho Line.

A  segment from Kotake-Mukaihara to Ikebukuro, running parallel to the Yurakucho Line on separate tracks began operation in 1994.

Technical problems resulted in delays of up to 30 minutes during the Fukutoshin Line's first few days of operation.

From 10 September 2012, 10-car 5050-4000 series sets entered revenue service on the Tokyo Metro Fukutoshin Line, with inter-running through to the Seibu Ikebukuro Line (via Seibu Yurakucho Line) and Tobu Tojo Line.

See also
 List of railway lines in Japan

References

Japan Railfan Magazine July 2008 issue
平成20年6月14日（土）副都心線開業

External links

 Fukutoshin Line (Tokyo Metro) 

 
Fukutoshin Line
Railway lines in Tokyo
Rail transport in Saitama Prefecture
1067 mm gauge railways in Japan
Railway lines opened in 1994
1994 establishments in Japan
1500 V DC railway electrification